Dufourea echinocacti, the barrel cactus dufourea, is a species of sweat bee in the family Halictidae. It is found in North America, mainly in California and northwestern Mexico. The name Echinocacti comes from its affinity for the Echinocactus genus of barrel cactus, which are found throughout the Dufourea Echinicacti's habitat. It was first described by Philip Hunter Timberlake in 1939.

References

Further reading

 

Halictidae
Articles created by Qbugbot
Insects described in 1939